Glasau is a municipality in the district of Segeberg, in Schleswig-Holstein, Germany. It is name after the estate and the manor house of the same name. Sarau is the largest village in the municipality; about half of the population lives there.

History
From March 29, 1945 until May 5, 1945 a concentration camp was established near Glasau. It was a subcamp to the Neuengamme concentration camp.

See also
List of subcamps of Neuengamme

Notes

Municipalities in Schleswig-Holstein
Neuengamme concentration camp
Segeberg